The Anti-apoptotic Ras signaling cascade is an intracellular signal transduction cascade
that involves the Ras protein and inhibits apoptosis. It is the target of the cancer drug gefitinib.

It may refer to the PI3K/AKT pathway.

It may refer to the MAPK/ERK pathway which involves ras and can affect apoptosis.

The anti-apoptotic STAT pathway does not involve Ras.

See also
Ras subfamily

References

External links
 Diagram of ras onwards.

Signal transduction
Cell cycle
Apoptosis